Old Man of the Hills is an  mountain summit located in Teton County of the U.S. state of Montana.

Description

Old Man of the Hills is located along the Rocky Mountain Front, which is a subset of the Rocky Mountains. It is situated seven miles east of the Continental Divide, along the Bob Marshall Wilderness boundary, on land managed by Lewis and Clark National Forest. The nearest town is Choteau, 32 miles to the southeast, and the nearest higher neighbor is Mount Frazier, 2.6 miles to the south-southeast. Precipitation runoff from the mountain drains into headwaters of Dupuyer Creek, and eventually makes its way to the Marias River.

Geology

Old Man of the Hills is composed of sedimentary rock laid down during the Precambrian to Jurassic periods. Formed in shallow seas, this sedimentary rock was pushed east and over the top of younger rock during the Laramide orogeny.

Climate

Based on the Köppen climate classification, Old Man of the Hills has an alpine subarctic climate characterized by long, usually very cold winters, and mild to warm summers. Winter temperatures can drop below −10 °F with wind chill factors below −30 °F.

See also

 Geology of the Rocky Mountains

References

External links
 Weather: Old Man of the Hills

Mountains of Montana
North American 2000 m summits
Lewis and Clark National Forest